Kenneth Burton FRS (26 June 1926 – 22 November 2010) was a British biochemist, and Professor at the University of Newcastle upon Tyne. He was educated at High Pavement Grammar School (Nottingham), Wath Grammar School and King's College, Cambridge. When elected a Fellow of the Royal Society he was described as 'Distinguished for his contributions to knowledge of DNA structure and the mechanism of synthesis of bacteriophage nucleic acids.'

References

1926 births
2010 deaths
British biochemists
Academics of Newcastle University
Fellows of the Royal Society
Alumni of King's College, Cambridge
People educated at Wath Academy
People educated at Nottingham High Pavement Grammar School